Ronald Eugene Dove (born September 7, 1935) is an American pop and country music singer-songwriter who had a string of hit pop records in the mid to late 1960s and several country chart records in the 1970s and 1980s.

Early life
Ronnie Dove, the only son of Fairfax County, Virginia police sergeant Paul S. Dove and his first wife, Catherine Pearl nee Smith Dove Rusk, was born in Herndon, Virginia, United States, his older sister is Marjorie L. Forrester.  During his stint in the Coast Guard, Dove began his singing career in the clubs of Baltimore, where he was stationed. He formed a group, The Belltones, and they played Baltimore and the East Coast for four years. In 1959, they recorded their debut single "Lover Boy" on their own label.  In 1961, they released a cover of the Buddy Knox hit "Party Doll" on Decca Records, but it failed to chart. They issued one more single on Jalo Records before the group broke up and Dove went solo.

Career
He went solo and signed with Diamond Records in 1964. His first solo single, "Sweeter Than Sugar" appeared in April 1964 to no national fanfare, though it did appear in some local hit parades.  Later that year, Diamond released "Say You" which peaked at position #40 by means of the Billboard hit parade, and became his first national hit parade success. The next single, a cover of Wanda Jackson's "Right Or Wrong," put him into the Top 20.  In 1965, he had 5 chart singles and after just three albums Diamond Records released a "best of" collection.  His name was featured many times in both Billboard and Cashbox awards in 1965.

More hits came in 1966 and 1967 including "My Babe", “Cry”, "Happy Summer Days" and several others.
After releasing his cover of Johnnie Ray’s song “Cry”, Ronnie appeared on The Ed Sullivan Show to sing the song. He continued to record for Diamond until it was sold in 1970 to Aubrey Mayhew's Certron Records.  There, he recorded a live album and several singles that went unreleased. However, Certron did issue a “Greatest Hits” compilation of his Diamond songs, as well as one unreleased song.  The label had money issues from the start and went bankrupt in 1971. Shortly thereafter, he went to the independent Wrayco Records and released a Bobby Hebb cover of the song "Sunny”.  The single received no promotion from the label and subsequently failed to chart.

Country music
After his stints with Certron and Wrayco, he signed a new deal with Decca Records in 1971 and pointed his career in a more country oriented direction, scoring two minor country chart hits and an album. Later, he moved to the Motown country label Melodyland and had a top 40 country hit with a cover of Bobby Darin’s "Things", which would become his highest charting country hit, reaching #25.  During this period, he recorded two albums of country music, but neither ended up being released.  Although he moved to some smaller, independent labels throughout the rest of the 1970’s and 1980’s, he still continued to record.  Dove opened his own club in Baltimore, and his fans were able to see him perform through the 1980s.  He briefly revived the Diamond record label in 1987 to release a couple of singles and an album.  These two singles managed to reach the lower rungs of Billboard's Country charts.

Later career
Dove quit show business in 1989 to care for his ailing mother.  She died in 1991, and Dove resumed performing.  Dove continues to perform, mostly on the East Coast, and nationwide. There have been several compilations issued on CD, including The Complete Original Chart Hits: 1964-69, available from Real Gone Music.  Dove owns the rights to his music catalog.

In 2018, Ronnie Dove Music reissued his 1967 album Cry album digitally, sourced from newly available tapes. As of 2021, all of his Diamond Records albums (including 1988's From The Heart) have been reissued digitally.

In 2019, Ronnie’s song “Happy Summer Days” was featured in an Amazon commercial.

Television
Dove has appeared on The Ed Sullivan Show, American Bandstand, Where the Action Is, The Mike Douglas Show, The Merv Griffin Show, The Lloyd Thaxton Show, The Bob Braun Show, That Nashville Music, Nashville Now, and several other local and national television shows. More recently, he appeared on RFD-TV’s “Shotgun Red Variety Show” in 2013.

In addition, he also hosted his own television show. “The Ronnie Dove Show” aired on several stations throughout the East coast in 1966. Only two episodes of the show survive (one featuring The Drifters, the other featuring Bobbi Martin) and Ronnie sells DVDs of the shows on his website as well as at some personal appearances.

Discography

Studio albums

A These two albums were released as radio station promos only, no stock copies were ever available.

Ronnie's Diamond Records albums are currently being reissued digitally by Ronnie Dove Music.

Compilations
The Swinging Teen Sounds of Ronnie Dove (Design Records, 1965)
The Best Of Ronnie Dove (Diamond Records No. 5005, 1966) U.S. No. 35
The Best of Ronnie Dove Volume 2 (Diamond Records No. 5008, 1967)
Greatest All-Time Hits (Certron Corporation #CS-7011, Stereo, 1970)
Ronnie Dove Sings His Greatest Hits (Power Pak Records #PO-286, 1975)
Ronnie Dove (My Dov Records, 1975)
A Little Bit of Heaven (Jolanina Group, 1981)
Greatest Hits (Diamond Records, 1988, cassette only)
The Best of Ronnie Dove (PolyTel Records, 1991)
His Best (Laurie Records, 1992)
Golden Greats (Collectables Records, 1994)
For Collectors Only (Collectables Records, 1995, 3 CD set)
Faces of Love (Mayberry Records, 1995, cassette only)
Rarities: 22 Hard to Find Selections (Collectables Records, 1998)
Greatest Hits (Collectables Records, 2006)
The Complete Original Chart Hits: 1964-1969 (Real Gone Music, 2014)

Singles

A “Right or Wrong” also peaked at #4 on the Cashbox R&B chart. Billboard was not printing National R&B charts at the time. It was Ronnie’s only record to hit the R&B chart.

B "Chains Of Love" peaked at #118 on the Record World chart.

DVDs
 "Time Capsule" (features his American Bandstand and Nashville Now performances among others.)
 "The Ronnie Dove Show" (features the only two surviving episodes of his television show from 1966.)

These two DVDs can be purchased from Dove's website.

References

Ronnie Dove 1

1935 births
Living people
People from Herndon, Virginia
American male singer-songwriters
American country singer-songwriters
Apex Records artists
Decca Records artists
MCA Records artists
Singer-songwriters from Virginia